Mario Is Missing! is a 1993 educational game developed and published by The Software Toolworks for MS-DOS, Nintendo Entertainment System, and Super Nintendo Entertainment System, later released on Macintosh in 1994. The player controls Luigi, who must travel around the world to find and return stolen treasures as part of a quest to find his brother, Mario, who has been captured by Bowser. Mario Is Missing!, part of a series of educational Mario games, marked Luigi's first starring role in a video game (although he was the main character of the 1990 Game Watch game Luigi's Hammer Toss), which would not occur again until 2001, when Luigi's Mansion was released for the GameCube.

Gameplay

Mario Is Missing! is an educational game. The computer version is a point-and-click adventure while the NES and SNES have platform game elements. In the game, Bowser, king of the Koopas, has relocated from the Mushroom Kingdom to the real world where he has set up his headquarters in an Antarctic castle. Bowser plans to steal the Earth's treasures with the use of the Passcode-Operated Remote Transportation and Larceny System (PORTALS) which allows his Koopas to teleport anywhere in the world. Bowser intends to sell the treasures to pay for enough hairdryers so he can melt the ice of Antarctica. He captures Mario to prevent him from foiling the plan and it is up to Mario's brother Luigi to save him.

The player controls Luigi throughout the game. At the beginning of the game, Luigi and dinosaur Yoshi are at Bowser's castle and Luigi has access to the PORTALS, allowing him to teleport to cities where the Koopas are operating. The player can view a map of the city that Luigi is in, as well as a map of the world that is known as the Globulator. The player can use the Globulator to control Yoshi's movements across the world, which is necessary to reunite Yoshi with Luigi. The player has access to a computer that keeps track of various clues learned throughout the game, including information gained from speaking to people in the cities Luigi visits and pamphlets regarding the landmarks that have had something stolen from them.

Notable locations in the game include Cairo, New York City, Mexico City, Paris, Buenos Aires and Tokyo. Missing artifacts include Big Ben, the Mona Lisa, the Great Sphinx of Giza, and strangely enough, King Kong. Upon arriving in each city, the player must figure out what city Luigi is in and determine what artifact has been stolen and where it can be found. To figure these out, the player must talk to local people and ask them questions. Each city contains multiple tourist information centers as well as three stolen treasures, which are obtained by dispatching the Koopa who is carrying each one. In the version for Macintosh PC and MS-DOS the number of treasures that have to be retrieved from the Koopas in each city varies, ranging between three and five that need to be recovered and returned. The treasure must be taken to the correct tourist information center, where the attendant in charge of the center asks the player general questions about the artifact they are returning to ensure it is authentic. When the artifact is restored, a picture is taken of Luigi with the artifact and is placed into a photo album. The player must summon Yoshi to Luigi's current location so the dinosaur can eat a Pokey that is blocking the level exit leading back to Bowser's castle. After helping five cities recover their missing artifacts, Luigi faces one of Bowser's Koopaling kids blocking the way up to the next floor. After defeating all of them he defeats Bowser, stops his plan and rescues Mario. The ending differs between versions: The SNES version has Luigi send Bowser flying out of his castle with a cannon where he lands in the snow, freezes solid, and then breaks up into pieces, while the Macintosh and MS-DOS version has him attempt to attack Luigi before he can stop his plan, only for Luigi to avoid him and pull off his shell, leaving Bowser to slink away in embarrassment while Luigi retrieves the key to Mario's cell from the shell. Bowser returns and Luigi dupes him into looking for the key in the snow below, allowing Luigi to kick him over the wall into the snow below before then releasing Mario, reuniting with Yoshi and heading for home with Bowser's plan thwarted.

Development and release
To capitalize on educational games which were popular at the time, Nintendo partnered with Radical Entertainment to create an educational Mario game. Nintendo licensed the Mario characters but was otherwise not involved in the game's development nor was Mario creator Shigeru Miyamoto. The Software Toolworks released the game for MS-DOS in January 1993. Mario Is Missing! marked Luigi's first starring role in a video game, followed by the Luigi's Mansion series of games.

Nintendo later re-released the game for their own video game consoles. In the United States, The Software Toolworks had released the NES and SNES versions by June 1993. By October 1993, Mindscape had published said NES and SNES versions in Europe. The SNES version used audio and visual assets from Super Mario World. The DOS version uses stretched-out character animations unlike the later versions.

In the United States, The Software Toolworks released a Macintosh version on CD-ROM and floppy disks in June 1994 under the title Mario Is Missing! CD-ROM Deluxe. The new version included 127 QuickTime clips featuring 99 landmarks, like the Golden Gate Bridge and the Great Wall of China.

Reception

Due to the educational content rather than action-adventure that players of the time were used to, reception of the title was initially mixed. Still, sales of the NES and SNES versions exceeded $7 million in profit for The Software Toolworks during the second quarter of 1993.

Electronic Gaming Monthly reviewed the SNES version at the time of its release: three of the magazine's four reviewers commented that the game is too slow and easy for experienced players, but that it offers great appeal to its young target audience while providing good educational value. Reviewers for GameFan praised the game's SNES version and compared it to Carmen Sandiego. Nintendo Power noted the game's "excellent" graphics. GamePro, reviewing the SNES version, called the game "a good way to learn geography" but wrote that players should not expect it to be exciting. The magazine also noted that younger players would need help in progressing through the game.

Nintendo Magazine System UK reviewed the SNES version and wrote that it succeeded as both an educational and entertaining game, while noting that it would only be suitable for people of a certain age. SNES Force criticized the graphics and the restricted gameplay, adding that it was too easy for older players and too difficult for younger players. Total! wrote that the NES version was not as good as the SNES version, stating it was missing "a bit of the graphical humour – but it packs in almost as much game-play and educational value."

Chris Cavanaugh of AllGame reviewed the SNES version and considered it to be "somewhat enjoyable" for children but believed that adult players would not be interested. Cavanaugh noted the colorful graphics yet criticizing the repetitive gameplay and the "virtually identical" appearances of each city. AllGame's Skyler Miller reviewed the NES version and noted that the graphics were washed-out and lacking in detail, but stated that the overall game was "as good as can be expected" for an NES Mario game that was not created by Nintendo. Miller mentioned that the game should appeal to younger players because of its "relatively seamless" combination of instruction and action. Lisa Karen Savignano of AllGame reviewed the Macintosh version and considered it to be an enjoyable game with adequate graphics, but also stated that it was a simple game intended for young players. Savignano called the music "quite nice" but noted the basic sound effects and the lack of voiceovers.

Critical consensus of the game has changed over time. Luke Plunkett of Kotaku wrote in 2012 that unlike the NES and SNES versions the PC version "was the star, featuring not only more content but better visuals as well". He considered the game "awful" and not very educational. Kevin Wong of Kotaku noted in 2015 that the game was poorly received in many online reviews, although Wong himself praised the character animations and music and wrote, "I think the backlash against Mario Is Missing comes down to measured expectations; what is suitable or primally engaging at a young age could be dull and tedious at another."

In 2016, Samuel Roberts of PC Gamer noted that the computer version had poor pixel art and that "every street has the exact same buildings on it, and all the NPCs are exactly the same no matter where I go." Roberts also wrote that the game was "conceptually baffling and hated by Nintendo fans." In 2017, Seth Macy of 
IGN included the game on a list of the "Weirdest Mario Games Ever Made", writing that the game's weirdest aspect "is how Bowser weaponizes climate change to melt the ice of Antarctica, flooding the Earth so he can steal landmarks. It's a super villainous plot and would cause the deaths of billions."

In James Rolfe's review for his Angry Video Game Nerd series, he criticized the educational aspect, the awkward controls, enemies that can't hurt you, having to use Yoshi to get more information at the help desk, and the idea that you have to get King Kong back to the Empire State Building.

See also
 List of Mario educational games

References

External links
 
 Mario is Missing at Time Travel Institute

Luigi video games
Mario educational games
1993 video games
DOS games
Classic Mac OS games
Geography educational video games
Nintendo Entertainment System games
Radical Entertainment games
Super Nintendo Entertainment System games
Video games developed in the United States
Video games scored by Sam Powell
Video games set in castles
Video games set in Amsterdam
Video games set in Antarctica
Video games set in Argentina
Video games set in Brazil
Video games set in China
Video games set in Egypt
Video games set in Greece
Video games set in Kenya
Video games set in London
Video games set in Mexico
Video games set in Moscow
Video games set in New York City
Video games set in Paris
Video games set in Rome
Video games set in San Francisco
Video games set in Sydney
Video games set in Tokyo
History educational video games
Single-player video games
The Software Toolworks games